M80 Moosa  is an Indian Comical Television Series which launched on Media One TV, starring Vinod Kovoor & Surabhi Lakshmi as main protagonists. M80 Moosa was one of the leading series on Media One TV channel, until stopping its broadcast in 2017.

Plot & Timing
The show was based on the current issues in Kerala that effect the life of a fish monger & his family who live in the city of Kozhikode. The show had been broadcast on Media One TV at 8.30 PM (IST) every Saturday & Sunday.

Cast

Main Cast
 Vinod Kovoor as Moosa/M80 Moosa
 Surabhi Lakshmi as Pathu/Fathima C.M./Pathumma 
Anju Sasi as Rasiya Moosa
 Athul Sreeva as Rizwan Moosa
 C.T. Kabeer as Shukoor C.M.
 Sreejith Kaiveli as Susheelan
KTC Abdullah as Narikkuniyil Mamad Haji

Recurring Cast
 Prathapan Nellikkathara
 Rama Devi
 Vineetha
 Sasheendra Varma
 CT Kabeer
 KTC Abdullah
 Vineetha

Former Cast 
 Ibrahim Kutty as Balan tm
 Chembil Asokan as Joseph/Ousepettan

References

External links
 on Media One TV

Indian comedy television series
Malayalam-language television shows